Amandine Gay (born October 16, 1984) is a French feminist, filmmaker, researcher and actress. Her first film Ouvrir la Voix is a documentary giving voice to Black women in France that aims to give an other approach of feminist movements.

Biography 
Amandine Gay is born of a Moroccan mother and an unknown father on October 16, 1984, in France. Her mother and her adoptive father, both white, are respectively a school teacher and a roadmender living in a village near Lyon. She plays basketball at a good level. She graduated from the Institut d'études politiques de Lyon in Communications, and then from  the Conservatoire d'Art dramatique of the  16e arrondissement de Paris, that she joins in  2008:

My entire education, I did it in white environments, surrounded by racist people. I tried to make efforts but I was only just a black person for them. I've been pissed at a very young age. However, I would say that activism came with a certain political awareness. When in 2005, deputies UMP tried to pass a law, Law on the recognition of the Nation and national contribution in favor of French repatriates (loi sur le rôle positif de la colonisation), I was so shocked I decided to work on « the stakes and approach of the colonial question » as my research subject during my last year as a student in Lyon's political science school.5.

After her studies she starts working as an actress, but after a few months of activity, she realizes that she is always interpreting the same stereotypical roles (drug addict, prostitute, illegal immigrant). Her agent tells her that although he is sending her profile for roles corresponding to her age, she receives answers only when the scenario is specifying that the role is for a Black character.

In five years of work, I obtained only two "normal" roles, a lawyer on a TF1 series and a theater role, in which I played several different characters. After 5 years, I had enough: I ceased my career to become a film maker."

From this experience stems her will to become a filmmaker to promote another vision of Black women and also to be able to play the roles that she appreciates. She starts to write short programs for television, though she finds it difficult to find funding. Amandine Gay explains that film producers are usually white men in their fifties. They don't recognize their societal experiences in the programs that she develops. She co-writes a fiction, a satire of feminine magazines called Medias Tartes. One of the characters is a Black lesbian wine steward meets the misunderstanding of potential investors, who tell her that such a person does not exist in France, then this character is inspired from her own life.

For these reasons, Amandine Gay starts working on her own documentary film Ouvrir la Voix, thanks to a crowfunding campaign, without the support of the  Centre national du cinéma et de l'image animée (CNC). In this film which was issued in 2016, Amandine Gay réunites 24 women of African origins, citizens, activists, engineers, researchers or bloggers to talk about their identity of Black women in France. The film received the Out d'or for artistic creation in 2017.

Since 2014, as she did not see herself founding a family "nothing that could make a black child proud", she lives in Montreal to continue her research and produce films concerning issues of minorities, specifically linked to racism, echoing her own experiences "adoption by white families of racialised children"

She was for a time an activist within Osez le féminisme !, then declaring:

And again: 

She defines herself as of African descent, Black, born, afro-feminist , pansexual, antiracist, anti heteronormativity, afro-punk, pro-choice (abortion, veil, sex working), body-positive. She is an associated expert of the Berlin-based NGO Center for Intersectional Justice.

References 

Moroccan feminists
1984 births
French actresses
French emigrants to Quebec
French feminists
Black feminism
Living people